Al Wusta Governorate may refer to:
 Central Governorate (Bahrain)
 Al Wusta Governorate (Oman) (former region)